Xclusive Magazine is Ireland's only multicultural lifestyle magazine. It is an Irish African-only lifestyle monthly magazine and the only African magazine to break into the mainstream Irish media market.

About Xclusive Magazine
Xclusive Magazine was started in March 2006. It is published by Peter Anny-Nzekwue during the first week of every month.

It celebrates African people and affirms Ireland's multicultural life. It captures the world of entertainment and engages the readership with regular coverage, in pictures and titbits, of social, professional, fashion, religious, musical events, and general lifestyle.

The main readers of Xclusive Magazine are Africans and ethnic minority people in Ireland.

Xclusive Magazine is sold in Eason's, African shops and most newsagents in Ireland, in Belfast, and in London. It is also published online in Nigeria at www.xclusive.ng

References

External links 
1 ^Xclusive Interview
2 ^Xclusive Interview
3 ^origins of Xclusive

Celebrity magazines
Entertainment magazines
Magazines published in Ireland
Lifestyle magazines
Magazines established in 2006
Monthly magazines published in Ireland